Aleksey Sergeyevich Zagornyi (born 31 May 1978 in Yaroslavl) is a Russian hammer thrower. His personal best is 83.43 metres, achieved in February 2002 in Adler.

International competitions

References

1978 births
Living people
Sportspeople from Yaroslavl
Russian male hammer throwers
Olympic male hammer throwers
Olympic athletes of Russia
Athletes (track and field) at the 2000 Summer Olympics
Athletes (track and field) at the 2012 Summer Olympics
World Athletics Championships athletes for Russia
World Athletics Championships medalists
European Athletics Championships medalists
Russian Athletics Championships winners